Kaduthuruthy is a town in Kottayam District in the state of Kerala, India.

Geography 
Its name derives from Kadal thuruth, meaning near to the beach as it is believed that several centuries ago, the Arabian sea extended inward into the place, and that it receded due to a tsunami. 
Kaduthuruthy has a picturesque nature and ecosystem. It is a transit point between the hilly middle region of Kerala and backwater coastal land. The nearest railway halt is Vaikom Road Railway Station and main Railway station is Kottayam.

Another story believed that the origin of name "Kaduthuruthy" is Demon Khara got three "Shiv lingas" for his severe penance from lord Shiva, Khara started a journey by carrying three Shiv Lingas, two Lingas in each hand and one in his mouth. After a while he got tired as well the Lingas are heavy, he placed his right handed Linga in Vaikom, left handed Linga in Ettumanoor and from mouth is placed in Kaduthuruthy (in Malayalam it was called kadichiruthy).

History 
It was the Capital of erstwhile kingdom of Vadakkumkoor which has been annexed to Travancore in 1754 by Marthanda Varma. The first Sandesha Kavyam (Message in Poetry) in Malayalam called "Unnuneeli Sandesham" gives an insight into the history of the town. The author is believed to have been a member of one of the Travancore Royal Families. The work describes the grand harbour of the town in great detail, although the sea is now several miles away having receded some time in the 14th century possibly following an earthquake or a tsunami.

Thaliyil Mahadeva Temple

Thaliyil Mahadeva Temple (Malayalam:തളിയില്‍ മഹാദേവ ക്ഷേത്രം) is one of the best known Shiva Temples in Kerala. It is believed that the consecration at Vaikom and Ettumanoor temples was done at the same time as that of this temple, by the same person. There are also replicas of Vaikom & Ettumanoor Shiva Idols in the temple, thus it is believed that visit here is as good as a visiting all three noted Shiva temples (Vaikom, Ettumanoor and Thaliyil Mahadeva) on the same day before noon. The temple sits adjacent to the Ernakulam-Ettumannor Road.

Legends
According to legend, the shivling (symbolic representation of the deity) was installed here by a demon named 'Khara'. This demon (of the Khara Dhooshana demon duo) featured in the Ramayana, worshiped Shiva at Chidambaram and obtained from him three Shivalingams. He travelled holding one shivalingam in each hand and one in his mouth. Kadichiruthy Prathishitta later become Kaduthuruthy. The remaining two shivlings were installed at the Ettumanoor Mahadeva Temple and Vaikom Mahadevar Temple. The name Kaduthuruthy, also believed to have emanated from this temple and etiology has it that Kadichu (bite) Irutthy (make some one sit).

Temple complex
The Mahadeva Temple, otherwise known as Thali Temple in the name of Hindu god shiva. There are several other well-known temples in the area. Mahadeva temple is one among the famous three temples which Khara (of the Khara Dhooshana demon duo) of Ramayana built along with Ettumanoor and Vaikom.  A visit to three temples on the same day is believed to be very auspicious. Kaduthuruthy is the smallest of these three temples.

The Annual Festival at the Kaduthuruthy Thaliyil Shiva Temple is a ritualistic way of paying obeisance to Lord Shiva, the presiding deity of the temple. The annual festival celebrated for ten days in the Malayalam month Medam. The event is marked by various rituals and ceremonies. Dress code for men: White, Dhoti without shirt. For women: Saree with Blouse, Panjabi dress with dupatta, Churidhar with dupatta.

Holy Ghost Forane church, Muttuchira
Holy Ghost Forane church, Muttuchira is one of the oldest churches in India and is located 1.5 km from Kaduthuruthy town. The church belongs to Palai Dioceses of the Syro-Malabar church. There is an ancient Pahlavi inscribed granite has relief Cross found in Muttuchira. According to the local tradition, the Church at Muttuchira was founded in AD 510. Muttuchira Church is historically important. Archdeacon Jacob of Muttuchira was a native of Muttuchira and was based in this church until his death. He was buried in the Church of Saint Francis of Assissi, Muttuchira. He was appointed as Archdeacon by Mar Simon, the Chaldean Bishop who arrived in Malabar in 1576 AD during the time of Mar Abraham, as a rival. Mar Simon was sent to Rome but Archdeacon Jacob had followers until his death in 1596.

Bishop Alexander de Campo alias Palliveettil Chandy Metran belonging to Muttuchira Parish. He was consecrated Titular Bishop of Megara in Achala and Vicar Apostolic and Administrator of the Archbishopric of Cranganore on 31 January 1663, at Kaduthuruthy and celebrated his first Pontifical Mass at Muttuchira Church on 1 February 1663. Saint Alphonsa of India spent her early years in Muttuchira as she was brought up in her aunt's house, at Muricken family of Muttuchira.

Sun Temple

The famous sun temple Adityapuram is 3 kilometers away from Kaduthuruthy, which is known to be the second sun temple in India.
The MAHAVISHNU temple Devarthananam is 3 kilometers away from kaduthuruthy(kaduthuruthy -piravavam road)
The KAILASAPURAM SREEKRISHNA temple and MANGATTUKAVU BHAGHAVATHY temple are in the area.

Kaduthuruthy Valiya Palli

Kaduthuruthy Valiya Palli (കടുത്തുരുത്തി വലിയ പളളി) / Ave Maria (ആവേ മരിയ) of Knanaya Community was established in AD 400. The present Kaduthuruthy St. Mary's Valiya Palli is a third building in the name of Virgin Mary known as Kaduthuruthy Muthiyamma (കടുത്തുരുത്തി മുത്തിയമ്മ). Kaduthuruthy Valiya Palli had a glorious history in the past with its supreme position with the Vadakkumkur (present Vaikom) Kingdom. The history of this church is manifested with the history of the Knanaya community or the persian refugees known as Southist Syrian Christians(തെക്കു൦ഭാഗർ) now a day's termed as Knanites (ക്നാനായക്കാ൪). The present building is the third building in Kaduthuruthy constructed in AD 1456 and it had a strong fort as mentioned in the song of the church. Thus the present church building is constructed with all its artistic splendour and characteristics of Gothic Art, to proclaim and celebrate the gospel of Jesus Christ in worship and value the heritage of biblical faith, tradition, liturgy and the rich variety of customs and tradition in Knanaya Community guided by the forefathers. This church belongs to the Archdiocese of Kottayam and is considered as the Head Church (തലപ്പള്ളി) for both knanaya Catholics and Knanaya Jacobites.

Government and politics 
Kaduthuruthy assembly constituency is part of Kottayam (Lok Sabha constituency). Adv.Monce Joseph is representing Kaduthuruthy in Kerala Legislative Assembly. Justice K. G. Balakrishnan, who was the Chief Justice of the Supreme Court of India, is a native of Kaduthuruthy (Poozhikol).

References

External links 

 Official website of Kottayam District
 Official Page of Kaduthuruthy Valiya Palli

Villages in Kottayam district